The Olivetti company, an Italian manufacturer of computers, tablets, smartphones, printers and other such business products as calculators and fax machines, was founded as a typewriters manufacturer by Camillo Olivetti in 1908 in the Turin commune of Ivrea, Italy. 
Olivetti was a pioneer in computer development, starting with the mainframe systems in the 1950s, and continuing into the 1990s with PC compatible laptops and desktops.

History

1950-60s

Between 1955 and 1964 Olivetti developed some of the first transistorized mainframe computer systems, such as the Elea 9003. Although 40 large commercial 9003 and over 100 smaller 6001 scientific machines were completed and leased to customers to 1964, low sales, loss of two key managers and financial instability caused Olivetti to withdraw from the field in 1964.

In 1965, Olivetti released the Programma 101, considered one of the first commercial desktop programmable calculators. It was saved from the sale of the computer division to GE thanks to an employee, Gastone Garziera, who spent successive nights changing the internal categorization of the product from "computer" to "calculator", so leaving the small team in Olivetti and creating some awkward situations in the office, since that space was now owned by GE.

1970s
In 1974, the firm released the TC800, an intelligent terminal designed to be attached to a mainframe and used in the finance sector. It was followed in 1977 by the TC1800.

1980s
Olivetti's first modern personal computer, the M20, featuring a Zilog Z8000 CPU, was released in 1982.

The M20 was followed in 1983 by the M24, a clone of the IBM PC using DOS and the Intel 8086 processor (at 8 MHz) instead of the Intel 8088 used by IBM (at 4.77 MHz). The M24 was sold in North America as the AT&T 6300. Olivetti also manufactured the AT&T 6300 Plus, which could run both DOS and Unix. The M24 was also sold as Xerox 6060 in the US, and as LogAbax PERSONA 1600 in France. The Olivetti M28 was the firm's first PC to have the Intel 80286 processor. It was sold in France as the LogAbax Persona 1800.

The same year Olivetti produced its M10 laptop computer, a 8085-based workalike of the successful Radio Shack TRS-80 Model 100, which it marketed in Europe. These were the first laptops to sell in million-unit quantities, though the  itself only attained sales figures in the tens of thousands and went out of production within two years.

In 1985, the company acquired a controlling share in the British computer manufacturer Acorn Computers Ltd; a third partner was Thomson SA. Olivetti sold the Thomson MO6 and Acorn BBC Master Compact with brand names Olivetti Prodest PC128 and PC128S respectively.

In 1987, Olivetti introduced the LSX line of computers which was based on the Motorola 68000 series of processors. They could run either Olivetti's proprietary MOS or Olivetti's own Unix variant, X/OS. Intended to replace Olivetti's existing Linea Uno (L1) range of multiuser systems, introduced in 1981, the reported  investment in the LSX line by Olivetti was seen as a necessary measure to update its range, bringing increased performance, offering an upgrade path to existing customers (with a promise that existing L1 systems could be upgraded with a new processor card), and preserving a degree of control over product designs that would not have been possible by merely selling or adapting products from AT&T, at that time a significant shareholder in the company. For the high-end LSX models, Olivetti employed technologies from Edge Computer, an Arizona-based company pursuing higher-performance processor designs offering a degree of compatibility with the Motorola 68000 architecture.

In 1988, Olivetti released the M380/C, part of the Pandora project - an experimental system for multimedia applications. They also released the PC1 Prodest and PC1 HD (XT clones, similar to the Schneider Euro PC).

In 1989, the Olivetti M290S was released, featuring an Intel 80286 at 12 MHz, 1 MB of RAM and a 30 MB hard drive. That same year, the company presented their 80486-based next generation of workstations, with Olivetti's CP486 (Computing Platform 486) model (with EISA bus) being shown at CeBit. As part of a relaunch of the company's Open Systems Architecture (OSA) strategy in 1991, the CP486 was renamed to the LSX-5010, and an accompanying 33 MHz model was introduced as the LSX-5020, alongside the four-processor LSX-5030 and LSX-5040 systems. The CP486 provided sockets for a Weitek WTL4167 numeric co-processor and an Intel i860 RISC processor.

1990s
In 1990, Olivetti had its own distribution network in New Zealand through Essentially Software Ltd. (owned by Gary McNabb) located at Mt. Eden in Auckland and Wellington, where Olivetti M300-100 16 MHz PCs with 80386SX CPU were sold for NZ$7395 and used as graphical work station for design houses using Corel Draw as graphical program. The New Zealand distribution stopped in 1991 when Olivetti could not supply their PCs.

In 1991, Olivetti introduced the D33, a laptop in a carry case and the PCS 286S, a PC with VGA monitor and keyboard.
Olivetti also sold quasi-portable 8086/8088-based PCs with an integrated keyboard and one or two integrated 3.5" floppy disk drives, running DOS 3.27, an Olivetti OEM version of PC DOS 3.20 with minor improvements like the M21 portable (based on M24) and the M15. Also later Olivetti produced interesting laptops like M111, M211, S20, D33, Philos and Echos series. A very interesting subnotebook was the Quaderno, about the same size as an A5 paper – it was the grandfather of the netbooks introduced 20 years later.

Although Olivetti had committed to a range of MIPS-based workstations running Windows NT, introducing the M700 series in 1992 with the M700-10 featuring a MIPS R4000PC processor, the company pursued a partnership with Digital Equipment Corporation in 1992, putting its MIPS-based offerings in doubt as the company announced its intention to eventually focus on only two product lines: one featuring Intel processors and the other Alpha processors. This partnership eventually led to the introduction of the LSX 7000 range of workstations and servers employing Digital's Alpha CPU in 1994. However, just as Olivetti had abandoned its development of products based on the MIPS architecture, discontinuing the M700 produced by its Japanese subsidiary, by 1993, the company had also narrowed its development focus "entirely" to systems based on Intel's Pentium, merely reselling "semi-finished" Digital products based on Alpha.

Olivetti did attempt to recover its position by introducing the Envision in 1995, a full multimedia PC, to be used in the living room; this project was a failure. Packard Bell managed to successfully introduce a similar product in the U.S. but only some years later.

The company continued to develop personal computers until it sold its PC business in 1997.

Models

Peripherals
 PR40, PR2, PR2-e, PR2+, PR2-10 Scanner Printer which was used in banking sectors
 PG-series and PGL-series - black and white digital printers
 d-Color p-series color digital printers
 A3 and A4 series MFP

See also
 Macchine per scrivere della Olivetti (it): the list of every model of Olivetti typewriter and related article on the Italian Wikipedia
 Olivetti S.p.A.
 Olivetti typewriters

References

Olivetti S.p.A.
Olivetti computers
Olivetti personal computers